Aghorenath (also spelt Aghornath) Chattopadhyay (1851–1915) was an Indian  educationist and social reformer.  First Indian to secure a D.Sc. (Doctor of Science) degree, he later became the first principal of Nizam College, Hyderabad.  The renowned poet and Indian political activist  Sarojini Naidu was his eldest daughter.

Biography

Early years 

Aghorenath was born in Bhrahmongaon in Kanaksar Village Bikrampur (then in Bengal Presidency now in Bangladesh). After completing his initial education in Dhaka Collegiate School, he spent three and a half years in Presidency College, Kolkata before moving to University of Edinburgh on Gilchrist Scholarship for higher studies. He excelled in his studies and secured the Hope Prize and Baxter Scholarship.

Career and Politics 

Upon his return to India, he accepted the invitation from Nizam of Hyderabad State to modernise the education system there. He began with an English medium school. With Nizam's support he founded the Hyderabad College with himself  its first principal which later became the Nizam College. Later he also initiated efforts to start a College for Women as a part of Osmania University. He was instrumental in implementing the Special Marriage Act 1872 in the Hyderabad State, which was already in vogue in British India. Aghorenath was a prominent member of the intellectuals' collective of Hyderabad who debated on social political and literary topics. 
Around this time Aghorenath also got involved in politics.

He had differences of opinion with the Nizam on the Chanda Rail Project and a displeased Nizam suspended him from his job and deported him out of Hyderabad on 20 May 1883. However a few years later he was recalled and reinstated. In fact it was Nizam who later provided a scholarship for Sarojini to  pursue her studies in England.

Back in Hyderabad Aghorenath continued his political activism and hence was forced to retire early and relocate to Kolkata.  He and his wife Varada Sundari Devi set up residence at Lovelock Street, Kolkata.

Personal life 

Aghorenath was married to Varada Sundari Devi before he left for Edinburgh. During his absence Varada Sundari was an inmate  at the Bharat Ashram, an educational centre run by Keshab Chandra Sen.  She accompanied him to Hyderabad in 1878.  The couple had 8 children  four girls and four boys.  Sarojini was the eldest. Sarojini Naidu describes her father as a dreamer and an intellectual with unending curiosity. It was this curiosity that turned him into an alchemist in search of a recipe for gold.  After she published her first collection of poems "Golden Threshold", the  house where the family  stayed in Hyderabad came to be called   Golden Threshold.   This is currently a museum . Second daughter Mrinalini  completed  her studies from Cambridge and  later became the principal of Gangaram Girls' High School, Lahore, which is now known as Lahore College for Women University . Third daughter Sunalini was a Kathak dancer. Youngest daughter Suhasini was a political activist and first female member of the Indian Communist party. She married  A.C.N. Nambiar  but later they divorced.

Aghorenath's eldest son Virendranath was a leftist   and was in the British Crime register for alleged revolutionary activities. He spent his time in Europe, gathering support for activities against the British.  During his stay in  Moscow  he fell victim to Stalin's Great Purge and was executed on  2 September 1937.   Youngest Son Harindranath  was an activist, poet and actor. He received the Indian  civilian award of  Padma Bhushan in 1973.

Final days 
Aghorenath died at his Lovelock Road residence on 28 January 1915.

References

19th-century Bengalis
20th-century Bengalis
Bengali Hindus
1851 births
1915 deaths
Alumni of the University of Edinburgh
Scholars from Kolkata
Academic staff of Osmania University
Indian scholars
19th-century Indian scholars
20th-century Indian scholars
Educators from West Bengal
Indian educators
19th-century Indian educators
20th-century Indian educators
Indian social workers
Indian social reformers
Educationists from India
20th-century Indian educational theorists
19th-century Indian educational theorists
Indian educational theorists
Pogose School alumni